Matthew Ruane is a Gaelic footballer who plays at club level for Breaffy and at senior level for the Mayo county team.

References

1996 births
Living people
Mayo inter-county Gaelic footballers